Jenny Kropp (born June 17, 1979 in Grand Island, Nebraska) is a female beach volleyball player from the United States 

She studied at University of Nebraska–Lincoln where she became All Region in 2000 and 2001 and All America Second Team in 2001.

After graduating from college, she played professionally in Puerto Rico, with Vaqueras de Bayamón from Liga de Voleibol Superior Femenino two years.

She was named Sexiest Swimsuit Bikini Model Athlete on the 2009 AVP Tour, by the SoCal Beaches Magazine.

Clubs
  Vaqueras de Bayamón 2003

Awards

Individual
 2001 AVCA All-America Second Team
 2000 and 2001 AVCA All-Region
 2007 AVP Crocs Tour Rookie of the Year

NCAA
 2000 NCAA National Championship  – with Nebraska

AVP Pro Tour
 AVP Pro Tour Atlanta 2008  Bronze Medal
 AVP Pro Tour Chicago 2007  Bronze Medal

References

External links
 
 Jenny Kropp at the Association of Volleyball Professionals (archived)
 

1979 births
Living people
American women's beach volleyball players
Nebraska Cornhuskers women's volleyball players
University of Nebraska–Lincoln alumni
Sportspeople from Hawthorne, California
People from Grand Island, Nebraska
21st-century American women